The Chehalis Gophers was the initial moniker of the minor league baseball teams based in Chehalis, Washington. From 1910 and 1912, Chehalis teams had a different nickname each season and played exclusively as members of the Class D level Washington State League, hosting home games at Millett Field. The 1912 Chehalis Farmers won the league championship.

History 
Minor league baseball began in Chehalis, Washington in 1910. The Chehalis "Gophers" were charter members of the six–team Class D level Washington State League. The Aberdeen Black Cats, Hoquiam Loggers, Montesano Farmers, Raymond Cougars and Tacoma Cubs joined Chehalis as charter members in league play.

The Washington State League was reportedly organized in Hoquiam, Washington at a meeting held on March 6, 1910. The league was formed as a six–team league, playing a 21 week schedule. The franchises voted to split the shares of tickets equally between the home and away teams. Ten percent of the ticket earnings were to be given to the league for travel expenses. At the initial meeting, Walter A. MacFarlane was elected league president and W. E. Campbell was elected vice president. During the 1910 season, the salary cap was set, with a limit of $850.00 per month.

Beginning play on May 10, 1910, the Chehalis Gophers placed second in the Washington State League in their first season of play. Chehalis ended the season with a record of 35–19, playing under managers Fred Neghring and Thomas Kelly. The Gophers finished 1.0 game behind the first place Raymond Cougars (37–19) in the final standings. Fielder Jones of Chehalis won the Washington State League batting title, with a batting average of .358 playing in 37 games.

Coming out of retirement to play for the Gophers, Fielder Jones was still the property of the Chicago White Sox and reportedly needed permission from White Sox owner Charles Comiskey to play in Chehalis. Jones had been player/manager when White Sox won the 1906 World Series. Jones joined the Chehalis team and reportedly agreed to play for no salary. Jones was needed after the Gophers' player/manager Fred Neghring was allegedly stabbed by player Tamp Osborn on the team train. Neghring was unable to play effectively after the stabbing. Osborn was reportedly jailed after the event. Playing for the Missoula team in Montana in 1911, Osborn was allegedly involved in another knife incident at a Missoula, Montana restaurant in July, 1911.

In 1911, the Chehalis Proteges continued play as the Washington State League reduced franchises and became a four–team league. The Centralia Pets, Raymond Venetians and South Bend River Rats joined Chehalis in 1911 league play.

The 1911 Chehalis Proteges were runner–ups in the Washington State League. The Proteges placed second in the final standings with a record of 36–20, playing under managers Dusty Miller and Lenny Taylor. Chehalis finished 2.5 games behind the first place Centralia Pets (38–17) in the final standings, followed by the Raymond Venetians (25–29) and South Bend River Rats (11–44). Pitcher Ray Callahan, who split the season with Centralia and Chehalis, led the Washington State League with both 13 wins and 131 strikeouts.

In 1912, the Chehalis Farmers played their final minor league season and won the Washington State League championship in a shortened season. The Aberdeen Black Cats folded from the league on July 10, 1912, causing the four–team league to fold on July 14, 1912. When the season ended, the Chehalis Farmers were in first place with a 25–16 record. Playing under manager James Burns, the Farmers ended the season 3.5 games ahead of the second place Centralia Railroaders (19–17) in the final standings. They were followed by the Aberdeen Black Cats (16–21) and Hoquiam Cougars (17–23). L.G. Taylor of Chehalis won the Washington State League batting title, hitting .351.

The Washington State League permanently folded following the 1912 season. Chehalis, Washington has not hosted another minor league team.

The ballpark
The Chehalis teams hosted minor league home games at Millett Field (also Millet Field). The park was founded in 1898, and named after Daniel Millett, then owner of the property via a business share of the Chehalis Land and Timber Company. Millett was also the city attorney and served as mayor. The ballpark grandstands were removed in 1979. Millett Field has remained a public park. The park is located on Chehalis Avenue, Chehalis, Washington.

Timeline

Year–by–year records

Notable alumni
Ray Callahan (1910–1911)
Fielder Jones (1910)
Con Starkel (1910)

See also
Chehalis Gophers playersChehalis Proteges players

Notes

References

External links
Baseball Reference

Defunct minor league baseball teams
Defunct baseball teams in Washington (state)
Baseball teams established in 1910
Baseball teams disestablished in 1910
Chehalis, Washington
Washington State League teams
1910 establishments in Washington (state)
1910 disestablishments in Washington (state)